Vladan Milojević (born 9 March 1970) is a Serbian professional football manager and former player, who is the current manager of Cypriot First Division club APOEL.

Playing career
Born in Aranđelovac, Milojević joined the youth system of Red Star Belgrade in 1986, before making his senior debuts with Bečej. He then spent three seasons with Radnički Beograd (1990–1993), playing together with Darko Tešović and Zdenko Muf. In the summer of 1993, Milojević moved to Greece, alongside Muf, and joined PAS Giannina. He also played for Kalamata, again with Muf, before returning to his homeland and joining his parent club Red Star Belgrade in early 1996. Six months later, Milojević returned to Greece and signed with Apollon Smyrnis. He spent one season at the club, before switching to Panathinaikos and remaining there for the next three years. Subsequently, Milojević spent three seasons at Iraklis (2000–2003). He also played at Akratitos for six months, before spending the final six months of his career at his former club Apollon Smyrnis.

Managerial career
After hanging up his boots, Milojević worked in the youth setups at Iraklis and Red Star Belgrade. He won the national championship with the latter's under-18 team in the 2010–11 season. In June 2011, Milojević was appointed manager of Serbian SuperLiga side Javor Ivanjica, but left the club after three months.

In February 2012, Milojević took charge at Serbian First League club Čukarički. He led them to promotion to the top flight in 2013. Two years later, Milojević won his first trophy as a manager when Čukarički defeated Partizan 1–0 in the 2014–15 Serbian Cup final. He left the club by mutual consent in October 2015.

In November 2015, Milojević was appointed manager of Cypriot club Omonia. He left the position in May 2016. In August 2016, Milojević took charge at Greek side Panionios. He parted ways with the club at the end of the season.

In June 2017, Milojević became manager of Red Star Belgrade. He won the league in his first season in charge and led them to the UEFA Europa League knockout stage.

In the 2018–19 season, Milojević became the first manager to lead Red Star Belgrade to the UEFA Champions League group stage, having survived three qualifying rounds to eventually beat FC Red Bull Salzburg in the playoff round by 2–2 on aggregate. Red Star Belgrade caused one of the biggest upsets of that UEFA Champions League season by defeating the later winner of the season Liverpool at home with 2–0.

In the 2019–20 season, Milojević again managed to reach the UEFA Champions League group stage after defeating some tough opponents in the likes of København and Young Boys. On 19 December 2019, Milojevic announced his resignation as manager of Red Star Belgrade even though the team is 11 points clear in the Serbian league.

On 28 February 2020, Milojević signed a –year contract with Saudi Professional League club Al-Ahli.

On 3 June 2021, Milojević signed a 2–year contract with Super League Greece club AEK Athens.

On 17 October 2021, Milojević signed a 2-year contract with Saudi Professional League club Al-Ettifaq. He was sacked on 1 March 2022 with the team sitting in the relegation zone.

Personal life
Milojević is the father of Greek youth international Nemanja Milojević. He is also the younger brother of fellow manager and former footballer Goran Milojević and uncle of footballer Stefan Milojević.

Managerial statistics

Honours

Player
Red Star Belgrade
 FR Yugoslavia Cup: 1995–96

Manager
Čukarički
 Serbian Cup: 2014–15

Red Star Belgrade
 Serbian SuperLiga: 2017–18, 2018–19

Individual
 Serbian SuperLiga Manager of the Season: 2017–18, 2018–19
 Serbian Coach of the year: 2017, 2018

References

External links
 
 

1970 births
Living people
AC Omonia managers
A.P.O. Akratitos Ano Liosia players
Apollon Smyrnis F.C. players
Association football defenders
Expatriate football managers in Cyprus
Expatriate football managers in Greece
Expatriate footballers in Greece
First League of Serbia and Montenegro players
OFK Bečej 1918 players
FK Čukarički managers
FK Javor Ivanjica managers
FK Radnički Beograd players
Kalamata F.C. players
Panathinaikos F.C. players
Iraklis Thessaloniki F.C. players
Panionios F.C. managers
PAS Giannina F.C. players
People from Aranđelovac
Red Star Belgrade footballers
Red Star Belgrade managers
Red Star Belgrade non-playing staff
Serbia and Montenegro expatriate footballers
Serbia and Montenegro expatriate sportspeople in Greece
Serbia and Montenegro footballers
Serbian expatriate football managers
Serbian expatriate sportspeople in Cyprus
Serbian expatriate sportspeople in Greece
Serbian football managers
Serbian footballers
Serbian SuperLiga managers
Super League Greece managers
Super League Greece players
Al-Ahli Saudi FC managers
Ettifaq FC managers
Saudi Professional League managers
Expatriate football managers in Saudi Arabia
Serbian expatriate sportspeople in Saudi Arabia